Blonde and Beyond is a compilation album of recordings by Blondie released on Chrysalis Records in 1993.

As of August 9, 2005 it has sold 43,000 copies in United States.

Overview
Blonde and Beyond is a compilation that gathers some of the band's hit singles like "Heart of Glass", "Denis", "X Offender", "Picture This" and "Island Of Lost Souls" along with album tracks, single b-sides and previously unreleased recordings, which include three demos ("Underground Girl", "Scenery" and "Once I Had A Love") and a live cover of T. Rex's "Bang a Gong (Get It On)".

Most of the single b-sides and previously unreleased songs included on Blonde and Beyond have since been recycled as bonus tracks on 2001 reissues of the band's studio albums or other EMI compilations.

Track listing 
 "Underground Girl" (Frank Infante) - 3:54
 Demo from Parallel Lines sessions, 1978
 "English Boys" (Debbie Harry, Chris Stein) - 3:48
 From the album The Hunter, 1982
 "Sunday Girl" (French Version) (Stein) - 3:02
 From the UK 12" single "Sunday Girl", 1978
 "Susie And Jeffrey" (Harry, Nigel Harrison) - 4:08
 B-side of "The Tide Is High" single, 1980
 "Shayla" (Stein) - 3:56
 From the album Eat to the Beat, 1979
 "Denis" (Neil Levenson) - 2:17 
 From the album Plastic Letters, 1978
 "X Offender" (Harry, Gary Valentine) - 3:11
 From the album Blondie, 1977
 "Poets Problem" (Jimmy Destri) - 2:19 
 B-side to "(I'm Always Touched By Your) Presence, Dear" single, 1978
 "Scenery" (Valentine) - 3:08
 Demo from Blondie sessions, 1976
 "Picture This" (Harry, Stein, Destri) - 2:55
 From the album Parallel Lines, 1978
 "Angels on the Balcony" (Laura Davis, Destri) - 3:37
 From the album Autoamerican, 1980
 "Once I Had a Love" (Harry, Stein) - 3:11
 The early version of "Heart of Glass", 1976. 
 "I'm Gonna Love You Too"  (Joe B. Mauldin, Niki Sullivan, Norman Petty) - 2:08 
 From the album Parallel Lines, 1978
 "Island of Lost Souls" (Stein, Harry) - 3:49
 Original version appears on album The Hunter, 1982
 "Call Me" (Spanish Version) (Giorgio Moroder, Harry) - 3:31
 From the 12" single "Call Me", 1980
 "Heart of Glass" (Disco Version) (Harry, Stein) - 5:48
 Original version appears on the album Parallel Lines, 1978
 "Ring of Fire" (Live) (June Carter, Merle Kilgore) - 3:30
 From the soundtrack album "Roadie", 1980
 "Bang a Gong (Get It On)" (Live) (Marc Bolan) - 5:22
 Recorded live at The Paradise Club, Boston on November 4, 1978. 
 "Heroes" (Live) (David Bowie, Brian Eno) - 6:28
 Recorded live at The Hammersmith Odeon on January 12, 1980. From the UK 12" single "Atomic", 1980

Tracks  1, 9, 12, 18 were previously unreleased

Personnel 
Blondie
 Deborah Harry – vocals
 Chris Stein – guitar
 Clem Burke – drums
 Jimmy Destri – keyboards
 Nigel Harrison – bass guitar
 Frank Infante – guitar

Additional musicians
 Robert Fripp - guitar (track 19)

 Production
 Bruce Harris - executive producer
 Dan Loggins - compilation producer, audio mixer (track 12)
 Larry Walsh - mastering, audio mixer (track 12)
 Vincent M. Vero - project coordinator, discography research 
 Ira Robbins - liner notes 
 Henry Marquez - artwork/art direction
 Susan Bibeau - artwork/design 
 Blondie - producers (tracks 17, 18)
 Mike Chapman - producer (tracks 1 to 5, 10, 11, 13, 14, 16)
 Richard Gottehrer - producer (tracks 6 to 9)
 Giorgio Moroder - producer (track 15)
 Chris Stein - producer (track 19)
 Jimmy Destri - producer (track 19)
 Paddy Maloney - producer (track 19)
 The producer of track 12 is unknown

References 

Blondie (band) compilation albums
1993 compilation albums
Chrysalis Records compilation albums